The Nicholls Colonels men's basketball team represents Nicholls State University in Thibodaux, Louisiana in the sport of basketball. The school's team currently competes in the Southland Conference. Nicholls' first men's basketball team was fielded in 1958. The team plays its home games at 3,800-seat Stopher Gymnasium and are coached by Austin Claunch.

Championships

Conference championships 
Regular season 
Gulf South: 1976, 1979
Southland: 1995, 1998, 2018, 2021

Tournament 
Southland: 1995, 1998

History

NCAA Division I Tournament
The Colonels have appeared in two NCAA Division I Tournaments in 1995 and 1998. Their combined record is 0–2.

NIT results
Nicholls has appeared in one National Invitation Tournaments (NIT). Their combined record is 0–1.

NCAA Division II Tournament
The Colonels have appeared in two NCAA Division II Tournaments. Their combined record is 4–2.

Conference affiliations

* From 1982–84, Nicholls State was a provisional member of the TAAC. Men's basketball did not play any conference games.

Arenas

Stopher Gymnasium

Stopher Gymnasium is a 3,800-seat multi-purpose arena in Thibodaux, Louisiana. The on-campus arena opened in 1970 and is home of the Nicholls Colonels men's basketball team.

Shaver Gymnasium
Shaver Gymnasium or Richard C. Shaver Gymnasium is a 750-seat on-campus arena that opened in 1958 and was the home of the Nicholls State Colonels men's basketball team from its opening until 1969.

Head coaches

Source:

See also
 List of NCAA Division I men's basketball programs
 Nicholls Colonels

References

External links
 

 
Basketball teams established in 1958
1958 establishments in Louisiana